Walmsgate is a hamlet in the civil parish of Burwell, in the East Lindsey district of Lincolnshire, England.

The name 'Walmsgate' means 'point of land of a man named Waldmaer'.

The lost village of Walmsgate is mentioned in 1377. A priest was last instituted about 1435, and eight families remained in 1563. The small church was still standing in the early 17th century. The limestone ruins of the church are Grade II listed.

References

External links

Hamlets in Lincolnshire
East Lindsey District
Deserted medieval villages in Lincolnshire